Kadapakkam  vilmbur village, is a developing residential area in North Chennai, a metropolitan city in Tamil Nadu, India

Location

Kadapakkam is located in North Chennai with  Manali New Town, Edayanchavadi in the east and Mathur to the South. Other neighbouring areas include Manali, Madhavaram, Kodungaiyur.

The arterial roads to Kadapakkam are the Anna Salai (Andarkuppam-Redhills Road), Tiruvottiyur-Ponneri High Road. This part of Chennai was considered socially backward a decade ago. However, due to rapid increase in need for quality affordable residential areas in and around Chennai, Kadapakkam became a hunting ground for real estate agents. With the Inner Ring Road becoming functional the area was easily accessible from the Chennai Mofussil Bus Terminus.

External links
Corporation of Chennai

Neighbourhoods in Chennai